Bishop Bridge is a medieval bridge across the River Wensum located to the east of Norwich, England. It was built in 1340 and is still in use in the twenty-first century. A gatehouse, completed in 1343, was located on the bridge until 1791.

References

Bridges of Norwich
Buildings and structures in Norfolk